Erfworld was a story-driven fantasy/comedy webcomic and independently published graphic novel about a master strategy gamer summoned into and stuck inside a wargame running from December 2006 to its abrupt cancellation in October 2019. It featured contemporary memes and pop culture references.

Erfworld followed a graphic novel format, with a new page added with each update. The webcomic's distinctive visual style countered the theme of unending violence with an artistic sensibility (described by the creators as "cute") in which characters are drawn to look like dolls, or anime characters, or toys. Injuries draw no blood in Erfworld, and damage is cured overnight. Also, characters are unable to use profanity, and feel pain when hearing the word "die".

Erfworld's plot, setting, and characters were released under a Creative Commons Attribution, Noncommercial, ShareAlike license.

Books
 Book 1, The Battle for Gobwin Knob was written by Rob Balder and illustrated by Jamie Noguchi. 
 Book 2, Love is a Battlefield was written by Rob Balder and illustrated by Xin Ye.
 Book 3, Hamsterdance versus the Charlie Foxtrot was written by Rob Balder and was illustrated by David Hahn and Xin Ye, with colors and inks by Lauri Ahonen and Lillian Chen.
 Book 4, Lies and Dolls was written by Rob Balder and illustrated by Xin Ye.
 Book 5, Temple Tantrum was written by Rob Balder and illustrated by Xin Ye, Lillian Chen, Connor Cercone, and Rob Balder. 

Selections from the end of book 2 were animated, Ken-Burns-style, with voice-over work by Arthur Chu.

Reception
Erfworld was recognized as one of the top 10 graphic novels of 2007 by Time magazine and received positive reviews and promotion from webcomics authors, and Time author/journalist Lev Grossman in his articles "Webcomics are the New Blogs" and "Erfworld: It's a Boopin' Good Webcomic!"  The addition of Erfworld to GiantITP was noted in "First Watch", Dragon magazine's monthly section on new developments in gaming and entertainment. Additionally, Erfworld was reviewed by Webcomic Overlook, receiving four stars out of five, and was profiled by NPR.

Following on the success of the Order of the Stick Kickstarter project, in February 2012, author Rob Balder launched the Erfworld "Year of the Dwagon" Kickstarter, seeking funding for a motion comic project. The Kickstarter was extremely successful, resulting in funding of almost $85,000, making it the fourth-largest comics category Kickstarter project as of May 2012.

Synopsis
Erfworld's premise is that Earth strategy gamer Parson Gotti is summoned as the "perfect warlord" into Erfworld where he is to serve as chief warlord to the side Gobwin Knob. Throughout the first book Parson orchestrated the defense of a city atop an extinct volcano. The second book focused mainly on how the relationships of supporting characters affected the way Parson conducted his campaign, and ended with Parson forcing an uneasy occupation of a previously neutral territory. In the third book the histories and characters of other sides were developed, Parson's occupation was defeated through the machinations of an enemy side, and Parson was imprisoned by a third party. In the fourth book Parson engaged in diplomacy to negotiate his own release and events spiraled out of control.

The fifth book, left incomplete when Erfworld was discontinued, focused on a completely different side in another part of the setting, and did not address Parson's situation at all.

Publication
The webcomic's publication schedule was intermittent at times as it grappled with artist exits and delivery issues. Erfworld was an early pioneer in crowdfunding, featuring the Toolbox, a Patreon-like funding mechanism that was created specifically for the comic and its site. In 2018 Erfworld attempted to use crowdsourced cryptocurrency mining as a funding source.

In May 2019, Balder announced that the comic would switch to 3D modeling: The stated goal of this change was to allow Rob himself to more easily create the images needed for the comic and hopefully return to a more rapid update schedule. In the same news post Rob explained that an undisclosed personal tragedy had occurred and, as a result, Erfworld would not be updating again "for the foreseeable future, possibly the rest of the year." This new event was dubbed Horrible Thing II. Nonetheless, updates did resume later in 2019.

On October 11, 2019, the website's front page was replaced with an announcement, signed by Rob and Linda Balder, which announced the permanent end to Erfworld as a webcomic as a result of a string of personal tragedies. The Erfworld updates previously published remain available in an online archive. All former functionality of the site was restricted to users with "heartstrings" badges. A few days later, the original copy of Book 1 was taken down from the GiantITP website. While the authors have not yet publicly explained the reason for the shutdown, it is thought to be due to the death of Andrew "Thor" Macht, son of Rob's wife.

References

External links
 Archives of past Erfworld comics

2000s webcomics
Fantasy webcomics
Fantasy parodies
Parody webcomics
Creative Commons-licensed comics
2006 webcomic debuts
2010s webcomics
American comedy webcomics